Chen Chwen-jing or Jonathan Chen is a Taiwanese politician. He has served as the Deputy Minister of the Interior since 8 March 2014, having previously served in the Ministry of Transportation and Communications from 2013 to 2014.

ROC Transportation and Communications Political Deputy Ministry

Taiwan HSR explosive device discovery incident
Commenting on the criticism on the slow evacuation during the discovery of explosive device inside Taiwan High Speed Rail on 12 April 2013, speaking at Legislative Yuan in mid April 2013, Chen responded that the MOTC will review evacuation measures for Taiwan railways systems.

Stopover by Mainland Chinese in Taiwan
Speaking in early February 2014 at a forum on economics and finance legislation, Chen said that negotiating with Mainland China to allow Mainland Chinese to transit stop in Taiwan heading to a third destination will be a very important issues on cross-strait transportation, especially after the establishment of three links in 2008 between the two sides. The current obstacle is that the Chinese mainland government requires their own people to have an entry permit to enter Taiwan, even for just a transfer.

References

Taiwanese Ministers of Transportation and Communications
Living people
Taiwanese Ministers of the Interior
Year of birth missing (living people)